The Grand Duke's Official Birthday (Luxembourgish: Groussherzogsgebuertsdag), also known as Luxembourgish National Day, is celebrated as the annual national holiday of Luxembourg. It is celebrated on 23 June, although this has never been the actual birthday of any ruler of Luxembourg. When the monarch of Luxembourg is female, it is known as the Grand Duchess's Official Birthday.

Development of the holiday
The monarch's birthday has not always been celebrated on 23 June. Under William I (1815–1840), the date was 24 April (although his actual birthday was 24 August), and under William II (1840–1849), it was 6 December, his actual birthday.  Because William I abdicated between 24 April and 6 December, the holiday was celebrated twice in 1840. Under William III (1849–1890), the date was set at 17 June until 1859, after which his birthday was celebrated on 19 February, two days after his actual birthday.

With the separation of the orders of succession, the Dutch and Luxembourgish thrones split in 1890. The Nassau-Weilburg monarchs celebrated their official birthdays on their actual birthdays. In 1947, the day was declared the 'national holiday'. As both the then-reigning Charlotte and the heir apparent (and regent) Jean were born in January, it was feared that their actual birthdays, therefore the nation's holiday, would be marred by poor weather. Thus, on 23 December 1961, the date was fixed on 23 June by Grand Ducal decree.

See also
 King's Official Birthday, a similar celebration in the Commonwealth realms 
 Koningsdag, a similar celebration in the Netherlands

References

National symbols of Luxembourg
National days
June observances
Official Birthday
Birthdays of heads of state
Annual events in Luxembourg
Summer events in Luxembourg